Casteil is a commune in the Pyrénées-Orientales department in southern France, part of the historical Conflent comarca. The abbey Martin-du-Canigou is located above Casteil.

Geography

Localisation 
Casteil is located in the canton of Le Canigou and in the arrondissement of Prades.

Population

See also
Communes of the Pyrénées-Orientales department
 Martin-du-Canigou

References

Communes of Pyrénées-Orientales